Geoffrey Gilyard Unsworth, OBE, BSC (26 May 1914 – 28 October 1978) was a British cinematographer who worked on nearly 90 feature films spanning over more than 40 years. He is best known for his work on films such as Stanley Kubrick's 2001: A Space Odyssey, Bob Fosse's Cabaret and Richard Donner's Superman.

Career
Unsworth began his career working at Gaumont British from 1932 to 1937. Having joined Technicolor in 1938, he acted as assistant director of photography on many notable productions, such as Powell and Pressburger's The Life and Death of Colonel Blimp (1943) and A Matter of Life and Death (1946). After working on some of the Gainsborough melodramas, he worked at the Rank Organisation throughout the 1950s, notably on films such as A Town Like Alice and A Night to Remember.

In the 1960s, Unsworth's work extended abroad, such as with the 1962 CinemaScope epic The 300 Spartans; the decade also saw him receive his first Academy Award nomination for his work on 1964's Becket. In 1965, he was responsible for photographing the Royal National Theatre's production of William Shakespeare's Othello.

His film work brought him an impressive array of awards, including five British Society of Cinematographers awards, three BAFTAS and two Academy Awards. Unsworth was especially in demand as cinematographer in two very different genres, period pieces and science fiction. Among the highlights of his career, he collaborated with Stanley Kubrick on the visually innovative 2001: A Space Odyssey (on which he was assisted by John Alcott, who would become a regular collaborator of Kubrick's) and Bob Fosse's dark musical exploration of the end of Weimar Germany, Cabaret. In Sidney Lumet's 1974 film adaptation of Agatha Christie's Murder on the Orient Express, his lighting and use of diffusion capture the danger and romance of the train while graceful integration of camera movement and optical effects contributes to the realism of the set while controlling the claustrophobia of the setting.

Unsworth's work reached its widest audience with Richard Donner's Superman in 1978. He was responsible for integrating the work of a who's-who of cinematographers and visual effects designers (including Zoran Perisic, an animation stand crew member from 2001, who extended Kubrick's front projection technique for Superman), with the plausibility and sense of grandeur befitting a (mostly) reverent take on a superhero. The style he developed alongside director Donner was essentially that of a science-fiction period film; the glamorous, often highly diffused cinematography observed a panoply of images of Americana, suggesting an epic timeframe for the film's scenes, a mythical America somewhere between the 1930s of the original comics and the 1970s. The style of the sequences that did not involve extensive science-fiction elements had to match scenes displaying Superman's powers.

Unsworth's other work in the 1970s included the Oliver Cromwell biopic Cromwell in 1970, the 1972 John Barry musical Alice's Adventures in Wonderland, John Boorman's 1974 fantasy film Zardoz, The Return of the Pink Panther (the fourth film in Blake Edwards' Pink Panther series), Richard Attenborough's 1977 war epic A Bridge Too Far. In 1981, he won a posthumous Oscar for Best Cinematography for his collaborative work with Ghislain Cloquet on Roman Polanski's Tess.

For Superman, Unsworth was not named in the Special Achievement in Visual Effects Academy Award the film received, but instead as director of photography, and without a separate credit for special effects work, he would not have been eligible. Donner expressed great disgust that the Academy of Motion Picture Arts and Sciences did not recognise Unsworth with a nomination for Best Achievement in Cinematography in 1979.

Death and legacy
Unsworth died of a heart attack in France at the age of 64 while filming Roman Polanski's Tess in 1978.

Both Superman and The First Great Train Robbery were dedicated to Unsworth's memory. As alluded to in the Superman dedication, Unsworth was an Officer of the Order of the British Empire.

He was admired for his charming manner at work. For instance, Margot Kidder was flattered when he arranged lighting for her shots and insisted on concentration by saying "Quiet, I'm lighting the Lady." His wife Maggie worked in the British film industry, often as a script/continuity supervisor.

Awards and honours

Selected filmography

Actor
The First Great Train Robbery (1978) - (uncredited)

Cinematographer

 The People's Land (1941)
 Gardens of England (1941)
 World Garden (1942), a film about Kew Gardens
 Teeth of Steel (1942)
 World Garden (1942)
 Make Fruitful the Land (1945)
 The Laughing Lady (1946)
 The Man Within (1947)
 Jassy (1947)
 Scott of the Antarctic (1948)
 The Blue Lagoon (1949)
 The Spider and the Fly (1949)
 Double Confession (1950)
 Trio (1950)
 The Clouded Yellow (1951)
 Where No Vultures Fly (1951)
 The Planter's Wife (1952)
 Turn the Key Softly (1953)
 The Million Pound Note (1953)
 The Purple Plain (1954)
 The Seekers (1954)
 A Town Like Alice (1956)
 Jacqueline (1956)
 Tiger in the Smoke (1956)
 Hell Drivers (1957)
 A Night to Remember (1958)
 North West Frontier (1959)
 Whirlpool (1959)
 On the Double (1961)
 The 300 Spartans (1962)
 Tamahine (1963)
 Becket (1964)
 Othello (1965)
 Genghis Khan (1965)
 You Must be Joking (1965)
 Half a Sixpence (1967)
 The Bliss of Mrs. Blossom (1968)
 2001: A Space Odyssey (1968)
 The Assassination Bureau (1969)
 The Magic Christian (1969)
 The Reckoning (1969)
 Three Sisters (1970)
 Cromwell (1970)
 Say Hello to Yesterday (1971)
 Unman, Wittering and Zigo (1971)
 Alice's Adventures in Wonderland (1972)
 Cabaret (1972)
 Voices (1973)
 Baxter! (1973)
 Zardoz (1974)
 Murder on the Orient Express (1974)
 The Abdication (1974)
 Lucky Lady (1975)
 Royal Flash (1975)
 The Return of the Pink Panther (1975)
 A Matter of Time (1976)
 A Bridge Too Far (1977)
 Superman (1978)
 The First Great Train Robbery (1978)
 Tess (1979) with Ghislain Cloquet
 Superman II (1980) with Robert Paynter
 Superman II: The Richard Donner Cut (2006) with Robert Paynter

References

External links
 BFI: British Film Institute website
 
 
 Geoffrey Unsworth at the TIME/IMAGE project

1914 births
1978 deaths
Best Cinematographer Academy Award winners
Best Cinematography BAFTA Award winners
British cinematographers
Officers of the Order of the British Empire
People from Leigh, Greater Manchester